Association of Music and Ballet Schools of Serbia (abbreviated: ZMBSS) is a national organization of Serbian music and ballet schools, and a member of the European Music School Union (EMU).

External links
Official website of the Association
Association's page at the EMU's website

Education in Serbia
Educational organizations based in Serbia
Music schools in Serbia
Serbian music